Shamako Noble is a hip hop artist, cultural organizer, and political theorist from San Jose, California. He was a candidate for U.S. Senate for California in 2016.  He did not actually file to be on the ballot.

He graduated from Abraham Lincoln High School in San Jose.

Career
He has been engaged in making music since he was 8 years old and has been involved with education and social movements since he was 13. His first professional position was a youth computer instructor in Compton, CA in 1993. As an artist, Shamako Noble has performed all over the United States and shared the stage with such acts as Talib Kweli, Zion-I, The Jacka, OneBeLo and among others. He has participated in numerous local and national events including Netroots Nation, the March for our Lives in 2008 in St. Paul Minnesota, The U.S. Social Forum, various National Truth Commissions and The U.S. Court of Women on Poverty in the U.S.

Shamako is a leader in the U.S. Green Party and the Green Party of California. In 2012 he was the Racial and Social Justice Organizer for the Jill Stein/Cheri Honkala campaign (the Green candidates for President and Vice President).  As of 2014 he is the Secretary of Culture in the Green Shadow Cabinet.

As an activist and organizer, he is best known for his work with the Hip Hop Congress.  Shamako helped co-found the Congress, along with Reali Robinson, and ran the San Francisco Bay area chapter for several years until the organization merged with a student organization of the same name.  After the merger, Shamako became the organization's Chair of Artist Development, and in 2003 was elected by the membership as the organization's second president while DLabrie took over the position as Artist Development Chair.

Shamako also currently serves as the Director of Education for the Hip-Hop Association, a grassroots organization whose mission is to "inspire civic action and cultivate cultural creativity."

A well-known advocate for incorporating Hip Hop culture into Education and youth programs, Noble has taught workshops and teach-ins at schools all over the bay area - from elementary schools to colleges - on a variety of topics including the origins of hip hop and organizing and activism in hip-hop culture.

Shamako has also written for many different websites and magazines, and in 2001 became co-editor (along with long-time collaborator Emcee Lynx) of H2O: The Hip Hop Observer, a monthly on-line and print journal of hip hop culture and activism which produced 3 issues before collapsing due to a lack of funds.

As an artist, Shamako is distinguished by his subtle yet aggressive style, and by his freestyle performance in particular.  He has been involved in the West-Coast battle circuit as a competitor and a judge for many years and won regional and local championships all over California.

His first album, The Return of the Coming of the Aftermath, was released in 2004.

References

External links 
Hip-Hop Association
Shamako's Myspace Page
REFUGE events
Hip-Hop Congress

Year of birth missing (living people)
African-American rappers
Musicians from San Jose, California
Living people
California Greens
Politicians from San Jose, California
African-American people in California politics
Activists from California
21st-century American rappers
21st-century African-American politicians
21st-century American politicians